A Minor Disturbance is the second solo album by guitarist Jack Starr, released in 1990 by Cariola Records and later reissued by Power Records.

Track listing
 "Exodus" – 3:57
 "Post Modern Funk" – 4:04
 "A Minor Disturbance" – 3:42
 "Interlude in the Afternoon" – 2:18
 "Sundance Strut" – 4:05
 "Love in the Rain"  – 3:22
 "Last Thing on my Mind" – 4:25
 "New York City Blues" – 3:55
 "Nothing to Declare" – 2:44
 "Last Date" – 4:06

Personnel
Jack Starr – Guitar
Randy Coven – Bass
Bonnie Parker – Bass
John Reilley – Drums
John Armata – Keyboards
Felix Hannenman – Keyboards
Joe Chinnici - Harmony Guitar

References 

1990 albums